The Audubon Society of Western Pennsylvania (ASWP) incorporated in 1942, with a history dating back to 1916, is located in Pittsburgh, Pennsylvania at Beechwood Farms Nature Reserve.

ASWP's mission is “to inspire and educate the people of southwestern Pennsylvania to be respectful and responsible stewards of the natural world.”  To that end, ASWP has a full-time education staff, a corps of volunteer naturalists who work to educate youth and adults through year-round programming, youth day camps in the summer, and a summer naturalist at Todd Nature Reserve from June to September.  The society also runs a series of environmental education camp programs for local schools in the fall.

In addition to ongoing education, ASWP hosts a number of community events, beginning with Maple Madness in the early spring.  In June, Audubon hosts Secret Garden events; in September, a fall festival called AppleJamm; and in October, a non-scary Halloween experience called Creatures of the Night.

The Audubon Nature Store, located at Beechwood, contains nature related and themed items for every occasion.  Birdfeeders and birdseed are favorites of many customers, however the inventory includes clothing, optics, jewelry, books and more.

Beechwood Farms Nature Reserve's trails are open dawn to dusk year round, and Todd Nature Reserve trails are available dawn to dusk except during the Pennsylvania Deer Hunting Season.

Conservation initiatives
ASWP is involved in a number of conservation initiatives.  First, the society works to publicize and aid in the stewardship of the Buffalo Creek Valley, Raccoon Creek, Enlow Fork, and Lower Buffalo Creek Valley Important Bird Areas.  The society is also in the midst of a barn owl research program, to develop a protocol for reintroducing barn owls to areas where their populations may be at risk.  The Audubon Center for Native Plants, a nursery developed to propagate native plants is located at Beechwood.  Native Plants are made available for purchase from May through September, and the society partners with numerous organizations to promote the use of native plants in Western Pennsylvania.  ASWP has recently completed administration of a Watershed Conservation Plan for the Buffalo Creek Watershed, where Todd Nature Reserve is located.  Implementation of the plan began in October 2008 and is ongoing.

External links
Audubon Society of Western Pennsylvania website

Pennsylvania
Audubon movement
Protected areas of Allegheny County, Pennsylvania
Environmental organizations based in Pennsylvania